Stan or Stanley Jones may refer to:

Stan Jones (Libertarian politician) (born 1943), American Libertarian politician and famous sufferer of argyria
Stan Jones (Indiana politician) (1949–2017), American educator and politician
Stan Jones (songwriter) (1914–1963), American songwriter of Western music
Stan Jones (racing driver) (1923–1973), winner of the 1959 Australian Grand Prix and father of Formula 1 World Champion, Alan Jones
G. Stanley Jones (1926–1998), Canadian-born American actor
Stan Jones (American football) (1931–2010), American football player and Hall of Fame member
Stan Jones (Australian rules footballer) (1908–1972), Australian footballer
Stan Jones (athlete) (1914–2006), British Olympic runner
Stan Jones (English footballer) (born 1938), English football defender
Stan Jones (mystery writer) (born 1947), American mystery writer
E. Stanley Jones (1884–1973), Christian missionary
Stanley Jones (cyclist) (1888–1962), British Olympic cyclist
Stan Jones (cyclist) (1922–1995), British cyclist
Stanley Jones (judge) (born 1941), Australian judge
Stan Jones (painter) (1930–2012), Welsh watercolour artist
Stanley Wilson Jones (1888–1962), colonial administrator

See also
Aiyana Mo'Nay Stanley-Jones (2002–2010), shooting victim of the Detroit Police Department, see Shooting of Aiyana Jones